The  is a railway line in Gunma Prefecture, Japan, operated by Jōmō Electric Railway Company(上毛電気鉃道 Jōmō dentetsu) . Its terminus stations are in the cities of Maebashi and Kiryū, extending 25.4 km. Eighteen of its stations opened on November 10, 1928, with one station added in each of the years 1933, 1939, 1993, and 1994.

History
The entire line opened in 1928, electrified at 1500 VDC, to service the local silk industry. The line was noted for operating freight services with its EMUs acting as the locomotive (it did not own electric locomotives), and for carriages that had 50% of the floorspace partitioned for the transport of silk. 

Freight services ceased in 1986.

Station list
All stations are in Gunma Prefecture.

Rolling stock
 100 series EMU car (special event use only)
 700 series 2-car EMUs (x8) (former Keio 3000 series)

References
This article incorporates material from the corresponding article in the Japanese Wikipedia

Railway lines in Japan
Railway lines opened in 1928
Rail transport in Gunma Prefecture